Jakub Plichta (died 7 February 1407) was a Catholic priest and the second bishop of Vilnius.

References 
 Wileński słownik biograficzny, Bydgoszcz 2002, 
 Piotr Nitecki, Biskupi Kościoła w Polsce w latach 965–1999. Słownik biograficzny, Warszawa 2000, 

Year of birth unknown
1407 deaths
Bishops of Vilnius
Clan of Półkozic
Polish nobility
14th-century Roman Catholic bishops in Lithuania